Heliodines is a genus of butterflies belonging to the family Heliodinidae.

The species of this genus are found in Europe and Northern America.

Species:
 Heliodines albiciliella Busck, 1909 
 Heliodines aureoflamma Walsingham, 1897

References

Heliodinidae